Dartmouth East is a provincial electoral district in Nova Scotia, Canada, that elects one member of the Nova Scotia House of Assembly. The riding is located in the community of Dartmouth, in the urban area of Halifax.

In 1978, the district was created to provide for an increase in representation of six members and in 2003, it lost a northern area to Waverley-Fall River and gained an area in Woodlawn. In 2013, following the recommendations of the Electoral Boundaries Commission report, it gained the Montebello area from Waverley-Fall River-Beaver Bank and lost the area east of Bell Lake to Cole Harbour-Portland Valley and lost the area north of Main Street and east of Caledonia Road until Geovex Court to Preston-Dartmouth.

Geography

Members of the Legislative Assembly
This riding has elected the following Members of the Legislative Assembly:

Election results

1978 general election

1981 general election

1984 general election

1988 general election

1993 general election

1998 general election

1999 general election

2003 general election

2006 general election

2009 general election

2013 general election 

|-
 
|Liberal
|Andrew Younger
|align="right"|5,469
|align="right"|63.85
|align="right"|+18.76 
|-
 
|New Democratic Party
|Deborah M. Stover
|align="right"|1,929
|align="right"|22.52
|align="right"|-20.69
|-
 
|Progressive Conservative
|Mike M. MacDonnell
|align="right"|1,167
|align="right"|13.63
|align="right"|+3.97
|}

2017 general election

2021 general election

References

External links
riding profile
 June 13, 2006 Nova Scotia Provincial General Election Poll By Poll Results

Nova Scotia provincial electoral districts
Dartmouth, Nova Scotia
Politics of Halifax, Nova Scotia